Bar Zilli is a building located in central Asmara, Eritrea. Currently, it operates as a restaurant and it serves as a commonly identifiable landmark to Asmara residents.

History
Bar Zilli was built during the late stages of Italian colonial rule and was architecturally modeled according to the art style of Art Deco.

Architecture
Bar Zilli is an easily-recognizable building that was featured in a Fodor's Architectural publication. The architecture is described as featuring a "curved façade with a mix of central vertical windows and small horizontal strips at the corners are the reasons why experts have called this structure “idiosyncratic” and “distinctive.” 

According to a New York Times article written in 2017," The Bar Zilli building looks like an old-fashioned radio set, with windows like tuning buttons."

References 

Buildings and structures in Asmara